Léopold Marien (22 March 1934 – 19 November 2018) was a Belgian decathlete. He competed for his country at the 1960 Summer Olympics in Rome, Italy where he finished 18th in the decathlon.  In Tokyo at the 1964 Summer Olympics he competed in the 110 metre hurdles, but was unable to advance from the first round.

External links
Léopold Marien's profile at Sports Reference.com
Léopold Marien's obituary 

1934 births
2018 deaths
Belgian decathletes
Belgian male hurdlers
Athletes (track and field) at the 1960 Summer Olympics
Athletes (track and field) at the 1964 Summer Olympics
Olympic athletes of Belgium